The Lowe Nunataks are a cluster of low peaks or nunataks  southeast of Mount Borgeson in the Walker Mountains of Thurston Island, Antarctica. They were named by the Advisory Committee on Antarctic Names after Photographer's Mate W.L. Lowe, an aircrewman in the Eastern Group of U.S. Navy Operation Highjump, which obtained aerial photographs of this feature and coastal areas adjacent to Thurston Island, 1946–47.

Maps
 Thurston Island – Jones Mountains. 1:500000 Antarctica Sketch Map. US Geological Survey, 1967.
 Antarctic Digital Database (ADD). Scale 1:250000 topographic map of Antarctica. Scientific Committee on Antarctic Research (SCAR). Since 1993, regularly upgraded and updated.

References

Nunataks of Ellsworth Land